The Amateur Second Division comprises a number of football leagues that make up the eighth and lowest tier of the Turkish football league system. Each province has its own league.

See also
Süper Lig
TFF First League
TFF Second League
TFF Third League
Turkish Regional Amateur League
Turkish Cup (since 1962–63)

References

6
Turk